Sven Salumaa (born on October 21, 1966) is a former professional tour tennis player who mostly played tour tennis in doubles.

Tour career
Salumaa was born in Huntington, New York to Eduard and Tamara Salumaa who were immigrants from Estonia.

During Salumaa's tennis career he won one doubles title and achieved a career-high doubles ranking of world No. 25 in 1992.  In 1990, he made the semi-finals in doubles at the US Open (tennis) with Brian Garrow, losing in five sets to the eventual champions, Pieter Aldrich and Danie Visser.

College tennis
At Indiana University, Sven made the All-Big Ten tennis team in 1986, 1987 and 1988 and holds the all-time career singles wins record at 108.  He graduated in 1989 with a Bachelor of Science in Business.

Post tennis career
Salumaa continued his education in 1998, and graduated summa cum laude with a Master of Business Administration (MBA) from California State University, San Bernardino.

After retiring, Salumaa opened up a music recording studio in Bloomington, Indiana where he went to college at Indiana University before his professional tennis career.  There he recorded local bands such as Hipmotize and the debut album of Big Bob's Farm.

In 2007, he worked with the New Hampshire theatre company, Shakespeare in the Valley along with Leila Birch, who played Teresa DiMarco in the BBC series, EastEnders.  In 2008, he appeared in the West Coast premiere of  Yank! A New Musical at Diversionary Theatre. Salumaa also appeared in the world premiere of the Patricia Loughrey and Rayme Sciaroni musical The Daddy Machine at Diversionary Theatre. In 2010, the musical Actions Most Ridiculous had a sold-out world premiere at the Coronado Playhouse where he was on the Board of Directors. Salumaa wrote all the music and lyrics, and co-wrote the book with Marianne Regan.

Salumaa has appeared in several short films, including Golden Hill, Duke's Day and B-Roll.

As of 2016, he lives in Madison, Wisconsin with his wife Anniessa and her two children, Talen and Noah. Sven teaches tennis at Cherokee Country Club and is also one of the assistant coaches for both the boys' and girls' tennis teams at La Follette High School.

Career finals

Doubles (1 title, 6 runner-ups)

External links
 
 
 

American male tennis players
American people of Estonian descent
Indiana Hoosiers men's tennis players
People from Huntington, New York
Tennis people from New York (state)
Living people
1966 births
People from Coronado, California